Xiangyang Township is a township under the administration of Nan'an, Fujian, China. , it has 7 villages under its administration.

References 

Township-level divisions of Fujian
Nan'an, Fujian